Wireless failover is an automated function in telephone networks and computer networks where a standard hardwired connection is switched to a redundant wireless connection upon failure or irregular closure of a default hardwired connection or component in the network such as a router, server, or computer.

Wireless failover is a business continuity function. That is, it allows businesses to continue operations even in the event of a network failure. In retail, wireless failover is typically used when a standard connection for a point of sale credit card machine fails.  In this instance, the wireless failover allows business transactions to continue to be processed, ensuring business continuity.

Infrastructure
Wireless failover solutions are offered in different forms.  A radio may be installed into the network.  Examples of this may include a 3G or 4G network connection. Additionally, 3G or 4G network cards may be used.  Also, a router may be used with an Ethernet connection.

References

Telecommunications